Never Say Die is a 1939 American romantic comedy film starring Martha Raye and Bob Hope.  Based on a play of the same title by William H. Post and William Collier Sr., which ran on Broadway for 151 performances in 1912, the film was directed by Elliott Nugent and written for the screen by Dan Hartman, Frank Butler and Preston Sturges.  The supporting cast features Andy Devine, Alan Mowbray, Gale Sondergaard, Sig Ruman and Monty Woolley.

The Post/Collier play had previously been adapted in 1924 as a silent film of the same name and was remade as the 2004 South Korean film Someone Special. Other films with the same or similar titles are not related.

Plot
When test results get mixed up, multi-millionaire hypochondriac John Kidley (Bob Hope) is told that he only has a month to live.  He dumps his fiancée, Juno Marko (Gale Sondergaard), while he is at the Swiss spa of Bad Gaswasser, there he meets a young Texas heiress, Mickey Hawkins (Martha Raye).

Mickey has been betrothed to the fortune-hunting Prince Smirnov (Alan Mowbray), but is in love with Henry Munch (Andy Devine), a bus driver from back home.  Believing he is dying, and wanting to help out, John suggests that Mickey and he get married, planning on leaving her his fortune so that she can marry who she wants when he's gone.  On their honeymoon, with Henry along as a chaperone, the couple fall in love for real, although, of course, they don't realize it right away.

Eventually, John bests the Prince in a duel, Henry and Juno get engaged, and John and Mickey get to stay together.

Cast

 Martha Raye as Mickey Hawkins
 Bob Hope as John Kidley
 Andy Devine as Henry Munch
 Alan Mowbray as Prince Smirnov
 Gale Sondergaard as Juno Marko
 Sig Ruman as Poppa Ingleborg
 Ernest Cossart as Jeepers
 Paul Harvey as Jasper Hawkins
Frances Arms as Momma Ingleborg 
Ivan F. Simpson as Kretsky
 Monty Woolley as Dr. Schmidt 
Foy Van Dolsen as Kretsky's bodyguard
 Christian Rub as The mayor

Cast notes:
 Hans Conried has a small uncredited part, only his second film appearance.
 Albert Dekker, who plays the uncredited role of "Kidley's second" was an established Broadway star before turning to film acting.

Songs
"The Tra La La and the Oom Pah Pah"  - by Ralph Rainger (music) and Leo Robin (lyrics)

Production
Never Say Die was originally slated to star Jack Benny and Franciska Gaal, under the direction of Raoul Walsh and produced by Arthur Hornblow Jr.  The film was in production from early October to early December 1938, and premiered in New York on 9 March 1939.  It went into general release on 14 April of that year.

Production credits
 Elliott Nugent - director
 Paul Jones - producer
 Don Hartman - screenplay
 Frank Butler - screenplay
 Preston Sturges - screenplay
 William H. Post - writer of play on which the film was based
 Leo Tover - photography
 Farciot Edouart - special photographic effects
 Hans Dreier - art direction
 Ernst Fegté - art direction
 Edith Head - costumes
 James Smith - editor
 Philip Wisdom - sound recording
 Walter Oberst - sound recording
 A. E. Freudeman - interior decorations
 Boris Morros - musical direction

References

External links 
 
 
 
 

1939 films
American black-and-white films
American films based on plays
Films directed by Elliott Nugent
Paramount Pictures films
1939 romantic comedy films
American romantic comedy films
Films with screenplays by Preston Sturges
1930s American films